There have been three major rail accidents and one notable incident near  in Cheshire:

 1948 Winsford railway accident - 1948
 Coppenhall Junction railway accident - 1962
 1965 Winsford railway accident - 1965
 1999 Winsford railway accident - 1999